Sarasayya is a 1971 Indian Malayalam-language film, directed by Thoppil Bhasi and produced by P. V. Sathyam. The film stars Sathyan, Madhu, Sheela and Jayabharathi. It is a sequel to the Malayalam film Ashwamedham (1967), and an adaptation of Thoppil Bhasi's play of the same name. It won the Kerala State Film Award for Best Film.

Plot

Cast 
Sathyan as Dr. Thomas
Madhu as Dr. Hari
Sheela as Sarojam
Jayabharathi as Sarala
Kaviyoor Ponnamma as Dr. Thomas's Mother
Adoor Bhasi
Alummoodan
KPAC Lalitha as Galy
N. Govindankutty as Mohanan
S. P. Pillai as Chacko
Thoppil Krishna Pillai

Soundtrack 
The music was composed by G. Devarajan and the lyrics were written by Vayalar Ramavarma.

References

External links 
 

1970s Malayalam-language films
1971 films
Films directed by Thoppil Bhasi
Indian films based on plays
Indian sequel films